Heavenly Slug is a 1945 Soviet comedy film directed by Semyon Timoshenko.

Plot

Major Bulochkin, senior lieutenant Tucha and captain Kaisarov - three fighter pilots, officers and best friends - vow not to fall in love until the war ends. But their plans are ruined after they encounter a female aviation squadron and a pretty journalist Valya Petrova. They start to give up one after another. At the same time, major Vasily Bulochkin - a flying ace - is trying to adapt to his "new" machine (an old-fashioned and very slow biplane U-2) given to him after a serious injury.

Facts

In 1944 Joseph Stalin ordered the production a lighthearted war comedy. The film was shot in 1944-1945 (while the war was still going on) and shown in theaters on April 1, 1946 to great success. It was the first Soviet post-war comedy.

Filming began near Leningrad, right after the end of the Leningrad Blockade. At the start of the movie one can see the original Yelagin Palace ruined during bombing (it was later rebuilt).

In the film Vasily Bulochkin (played by Nikolai Kryuchkov) falls in love with Valya Petrova (played by Alla Parfanyak). After the end of shooting the actor Nikolai Kryuchkov also divorced his first wife and married Alla Parfanyak. They lived together for 12 years.

In the dance scene female parts are performed by professional dancers from the youth war ensemble headed by Arkady Obrant. The ensemble gave around 3000 performances during the war, both at the front line and in the cities, including Leningrad during the blockade.

In 1970 the film was "restored". As with many other films of the Stalinist era, it was redubbed (mostly by the same actors, although Ranevskay's part was given to a different actress with a different voice) and censored. About 10 minutes were cut out from the original film, including the scene where Soviet newspaper Pionerskaya Pravda is compared to The Times.

In 2012 the film went through colorization. It was also fully restored - this time with original scenes and voices.

Cast

 Nikolai Kryuchkov - major Vasily Bulochkin
 Vasili Merkuryev - senior lieutenant Semyon Tucha
 Vasily Neschiplenko - captain Sergei Kaisarov
 Alla Parfanyak - reporter Valya Petrova
 Ludmila Glazova - senior lieutenant Ekaterina Kutuzova
 Tamara Alyoshina - lieutenant Masha Svetlova
 Faina Ranevskaya - professor of medicine
 Konstantin Skorobogatov
 Semyon Timoshenko

External links
 
 Nebesny Tikhokod in colour on Channel One Russia (in Russian)
 Nebesny Tikhokod in Russian Movie Encyclopedia (in Russian)

1945 films
Lenfilm films
Soviet black-and-white films
1945 comedy films
Soviet war comedy films
Russian war comedy films
1940s war comedy films
Russian black-and-white films
Russian World War II films
Soviet World War II films
1940s Russian-language films